The 1991 Floreat state by-election was a by-election for the seat of Floreat in the Legislative Assembly of Western Australia held on 20 July 1991. It was triggered by the resignation of Andrew Mensaros (the sitting Liberal member) on 16 May 1991, due to ill health. He died before the by-election was held. The election was won by an independent candidate, Liz Constable, who finished with 58.94 percent of the two-candidate-preferred vote. Constable became the first woman to win election to the Parliament of Western Australia as an independent (although not the first to sit as an independent – Pam Buchanan had resigned from the Labor Party earlier in the year), and only the third woman overall to win a by-election (after May Holman in 1925 and Judy Edwards in 1990).

Background
Andrew Mensaros, a Hungarian immigrant, had held Floreat for the Liberal Party since the seat's creation at the 1968 state election. He served as a minister in the governments of Sir Charles Court and Ray O'Connor. Mensaros resigned from parliament on 16 May 1991, due to ill health, and died of cancer thirteen days later. The writ for the by-election was issued on 14 June, with the close of nominations on 27 June. Polling day was on 20 July, with the writ returned on 31 July.

The Labor Party chose not to contest the by-election, as Floreat was regarded as a Liberal safe seat. Michael Huston won preselection for the Liberal Party, with the endorsement of Senator Noel Crichton-Browne (a powerbroker). Liz Constable had initially contested Liberal preselection, but withdrew from the process amid claims of branch stacking. She subsequently resigned from the party and chose to contest the election as an independent. She was supported by a former Liberal MP, Dick Old, who also resigned from the party in solidarity.

Results

Aftermath
Constable retained Floreat with an increased majority at the 1993 state election. The seat was abolished at the 1996 election, but she transferred to the new seat of Churchlands, which she held until her retirement at the 2013 election. Her chief opponent at the by-election, Michael Huston, contested the Senate at the 1996 federal election, but was placed in the unwinnable fourth position on the Liberal ticket.

See also
 1991 Geraldton state by-election, held on the same day
 List of Western Australian state by-elections
 Women in the Western Australian Legislative Assembly

References

Western Australian state by-elections
1991 elections in Australia
July 1991 events in Australia
1990s in Perth, Western Australia